Blake "Bilko" Williams (born 4 April 1985, in Baxter, Victoria, Australia) is a motorsports competitor who has won championships and X Games medals in several events, including motocross and freestyle motocross.  He was awarded the FMX rider of the year in 2009.

Racing record

Global RallyCross championship results

GRC Lites

Race cancelled.

Blake Williams also competed in the One Lap of America race with Travis Pastrana in a 2018 Subaru WRX STi, in the Mid-Priced Sedan & Stock Touring category. They placed 26th Overall, 2nd in Mid-Priced Sedan & 1st in Stock Touring.

References

External links
 
 

1985 births
Living people
Australian motorcycle racers
People from Mornington Peninsula
Sportsmen from Victoria (Australia)